T43 may refer to:

Vehicles 
 T-43 medium tank, a World War II Soviet medium tank
 T43 heavy tank, a pre-production model of the American M103 Heavy Tank
 T43-class minesweeper, a Soviet-designed minesweeper
 Boeing T-43, a 1973 United States Air Force military training and transport aircraft
 Cooper T43, a 1958 racing car
 SJ T43, a 1963 Swedish diesel-electric locomotive
 Slingsby T.43 Skylark 3, a British glider

Other uses 
 T43 (classification), a disabled sports handicap class for leg amputees
 IBM ThinkPad T43, a laptop model